Fløng is a small town in Denmark located on Zealand, situated between Copenhagen and Roskilde. The city has approximately 4,000 inhabitants.

Notable people 
 Mikael Pedersen (1855 in Fløng - 1929) a Danish inventor of the Pedersen bicycle, also associated with the English town of Dursley

Cities and towns in the Capital Region of Denmark
Høje-Taastrup Municipality